In enzymology, a NAD(P)H dehydrogenase (quinone) is an enzyme that catalyzes the chemical reaction

NAD(P)H + H+ + a quinone  NAD(P)+ + a hydroquinone

The 4 substrates of this enzyme are NADH, NADPH, H+, and quinone, whereas its 3 products are NAD+, NADP+, and hydroquinone.

This enzyme belongs to the family of oxidoreductases, specifically those acting on NADH or NADPH with a quinone or similar compound as acceptor.  The systematic name of this enzyme class is NAD(P)H:quinone oxidoreductase. Other names in common use include menadione reductase, phylloquinone reductase, quinone reductase, dehydrogenase, reduced nicotinamide adenine dinucleotide (phosphate,, quinone), DT-diaphorase, flavoprotein NAD(P)H-quinone reductase, menadione oxidoreductase, NAD(P)H dehydrogenase, NAD(P)H menadione reductase, NAD(P)H-quinone dehydrogenase, NAD(P)H-quinone oxidoreductase, NAD(P)H: (quinone-acceptor)oxidoreductase, NAD(P)H: menadione oxidoreductase, NADH-menadione reductase, naphthoquinone reductase, p-benzoquinone reductase, reduced NAD(P)H dehydrogenase, viologen accepting pyridine nucleotide oxidoreductase, vitamin K reductase, diaphorase, reduced nicotinamide-adenine dinucleotide (phosphate) dehydrogenase, vitamin-K reductase, NAD(P)H2 dehydrogenase (quinone), NQO1, QR1, and NAD(P)H:(quinone-acceptor) oxidoreductase.  This enzyme participates in biosynthesis of steroids.  It employs one cofactor, FAD.  At least one compound, Dicumarol is known to inhibit this enzyme.

Structural studies

As of late 2007, only one structure has been solved for this class of enzymes, with the PDB accession code .

References

 
 
 
 
 
 
 
 
 

EC 1.6.5
NADPH-dependent enzymes
NADH-dependent enzymes
Flavoproteins
Enzymes of known structure